"Bruised Water" is a song by English musician Chicane. It is a mashup of Natasha Bedingfield's track "I Bruise Easily" with his own song, "Saltwater". The song was released on 25 August 2008 as a digital download.

Releases

"Bruised Water" will be the first release from the revived Central Station Records in Australia. It was initially sent to radio in late 2008, but was never released as Central Station's parent company Destra Entertainment went into receivership. "Bruised Water" was released in the Netherlands by Armada Music in 2009.

Music video
The music video features a man carrying a mermaid, who appears to be unconscious without water, across the town. He asks the fellow towns people for their help to provide water for her. The video was shot along several streets of the city centre of Málaga, Spain.

Track listings
 "Bruised Water" (Chicane re-work edit) – 8:00
 "Bruised Water" (Mischa Daniels club mix) – 6:52
 "Bruised Water" (Adam K. vocal mix) – 5:59
 "Bruised Water" (original club mix) – 7:12
 "Bruised Water" (Mischa Daniels dub mix) – 7:16
 "Bruised Water" (Adam K. dub mix) – 6:04
 "Bruised Water" (Mischa Daniels Dubstrumental edit) – 7:16
 "Bruised Water" (original radio edit) – 2:59

Dutch CD single
 "Bruised Water" (radio edit) – 3:01
 "Bruised Water" (Michael Woods edit) – 3:05
 "Bruised Water" (Chicane rework mix) – 8:02
 "Bruised Water" (original mix) – 7:15
 "Bruised Water" (Mischa Daniels club mix) – 6:53
 "Bruised Water" (Michael Woods full mix) – 7:51

Charts

References

2008 singles
Chicane (musician) songs
Natasha Bedingfield songs
Songs written by Natasha Bedingfield
Songs written by Chicane (musician)
Mashup songs
Songs written by Ray Hedges
Songs written by Wayne Wilkins
Songs written by Andrew Frampton (songwriter)
2008 songs